The Brawley Seismic Zone (BSZ), also known as the Brawley fault zone, is a predominantly extensional tectonic zone that connects the southern terminus of the San Andreas Fault with the Imperial Fault in Southern California.  The BSZ is named for the nearby town of Brawley in Imperial County, California, and the seismicity there is characterized by earthquake swarms.

Geology

The Brawley Seismic Zone represents the northernmost extension of the spreading center axis associated with the East Pacific Rise which runs up the axis of the Gulf of California and is in the process of rifting the Baja California Peninsula away from the mainland of Mexico, with significant subsidence taking place at southern California's Salton Sea and at Laguna Salada in Baja California. Other major locations along the axis include the Cerro Prieto spreading center located south of Mexicali, and Wagner Basin (a submarine depression in the Gulf of California).

The Salton Buttes on the south shore of the Salton Sea are on the north margin of the Brawley Seismic Zone and are linked to volcanic and geothermal activity within the zone. The Brawley Seismic Zone has been interpreted as an "onshore spreading center" which runs diagonally across the Salton Trough.

Earthquake swarms
On August 26, 2012 near Brawley, a swarm of more than 300 small to moderate earthquakes occurred with the largest two reaching a maximum of 5.3 and 5.5. Some light cosmetic damage was found on some older buildings in downtown Brawley. Earthquake swarms are not unusual for the area. In 2005, also near Brawley, there was a swarm with a peak magnitude of 5.1, while in 1981 a swarm included one quake which was measured at 5.8. The swarm activity is not understood completely, but the new restlessness could generate data that will help scientists to gain a better understanding of the region. According to a geologist at the United States Geological Survey (USGS), such swarms are typical for the Brawley zone: "The area sees lots of events at once, with many close to the largest magnitude, rather than one main shock with several much smaller aftershocks."

Other activity

The Imperial Valley of southern California experiences high rates of seismicity with a pronounced portion of the activity occurring within the Brawley Seismic Zone that separates the San Andreas fault to the north and the Imperial fault to the south. The Imperial fault was the source of the 1940 El Centro earthquake and the 1979 Imperial Valley earthquake. The 1940 and 1979 mainshocks were of similar size and both were followed by damaging aftershocks near Brawley.

References

Sources

External links
 Fault History and Architecture of the Southernmost San Andreas Fault and Brawley Seismic Zone: New Constraints from CHIRP Data Acquired in the Salton Sea – American Geophysical Union, Fall Meeting 2006
 List of all events for Brawley Swarm – Southern California Seismic Network
 August 2012 Brawley, California Earthquake Swarm – United States Geological Survey

Seismic faults of California
Seismic faults of Mexico
Geology of Imperial County, California
Natural history of Baja California
Brawley, California
Gulf of California
Salton Trough